Wilmes or Wilmès is the surname of the following people:
Arlette Wilmes (born 1950), Luxembourgian swimmer
Philippe Wilmès (1938–2010), Belgian banker and businessman
Robert Wilmes (1928–2018), French politician and activist 
Sophie Wilmès (born 1975), Belgian politician and former Prime Minister of Belgium